Below is a timeline of important events regarding Zen Buddhism in the United States. Dates with "?" are approximate.

Events

Early history
 1893: Soyen Shaku comes to the United States to lecture at the World Parliament of Religions held in Chicago
 1905: Soyen Shaku returns to the United States and teaches for approximately one year in San Francisco
 1906: Sokei-an arrives in San Francisco
 1919: Soyen Shaku dies on October 29 in Japan
 1922: Zenshuji Soto Mission is established in the Little Tokyo section of Los Angeles, California
 1922: Nyogen Senzaki begins teaching in California with his "floating zendo"
 1930: Sokei-an establishes the Buddhist Society of America (now First Zen Institute of America)
 1932: Dwight Goddard authors A Buddhist Bible, an anthology focusing on Chinese and Japanese Zen scriptures
 1938: Ruth Fuller Sasaki became a principal supporter of the Buddhist Society of America (later known as the First Zen Institute of America),
 1939 Zengaku Soyu Matsuoka arrives in America 
 1945: Sokei-an dies
 1949: Soyu Matsuoka establishes the Chicago Buddhist Temple (now the Zen Buddhist Temple of Chicago)
 1949: Soen Nakagawa makes his first trip to the United States to meet with Nyogen Senzaki

1950s

 1951: DT Suzuki begins teaching seminars on Japanese culture, aesthetics, and Zen  at Columbia University in New York. Among the students are many influential artists and intellectuals, including Erich Fromm, Karen Horney, John Cage, and Allen Ginsberg.
 1953: Philip Kapleau begins formal Zen training in Japan.
 1956: Taizan Maezumi arrives in Los Angeles to serve at the Zenshuji Soto Mission
 1956: The Zen Studies Society is established by Cornelius Crane
 1957: Alan Watts' The Way of Zen is published, the book first popularizing zen with an American audience
 1957: The Cambridge Buddhist Association is founded by John and Elsie Mitchell in Cambridge, Massachusetts
 1957: Jack Kerouac's novel The Dharma Bums is published
 1958: Nyogen Senzaki dies on May 7
 1959: Shunryu Suzuki arrives in San Francisco to lead Sokoji
 1959: Hsuan Hua arrives in the United States and establishes the Dharma Realm Buddhist Association
 1959: Robert Baker Aitken and Anne Hopkins Aitken found the Diamond Sangha in Honolulu, Hawaii

1960s
 1960: Thich Nhat Hanh came from Vietnam to the United States to study and teach until 1963. He created the Order of Interbeing in 1966.
 1962: Kyozan Joshu Sasaki, a Rinzai Rōshi, arrives in Los Angeles, teaches in homes, and opens the Cimarron Zen Center in 1968.  It later was renamed Rinzai-ji.
 1962: Rinzai monk (possible fraud) Eido Tai Shimano moves to Hawaii to assist Diamond Sangha and Robert Aitken. 
 1962: The San Francisco Zen Center is incorporated, led by Shunryu Suzuki
 1964: Eido Tai Shimano (possible fraud) moves to New York and becomes guiding teacher of the Zen Studies Society
 1965: Philip Kapleau finishes The Three Pillars of Zen and returns to United States with permission from Haku'un Yasutani to teach Zen to Westerners.
 1966: San Francisco Zen Center acquires Tassajara Zen Mountain Center
 1966: Philip Kapleau establishes the Rochester Zen Center with the help of Chester Carlson (founder of Xerox), and Carlson's wife. Original Sangha consisted of 22 members.
 1966: D.T. Suzuki dies on July 12 in Japan
 1967: The Zen Center of Los Angeles is founded by Taizan Maezumi and his students
 1967: Kobun Chino Otogawa arrives in San Francisco to assist Shunryu Suzuki
 1967: Sojun Mel Weitsman and Shunryu Suzuki co-found the Berkeley Zen Center
 1968: Samu Sunim founds the Zen Lotus Society in New York City (aka Buddhist Society for Compassionate Wisdom)
 1968: New York Zendo Shobo-Ji of the Zen Studies Society of New York City is officially inaugurated by Soen Nakagawa on his 7th trip to the USA
 1969: Seikan Hasegawa, a Zen Buddhist priest from Japan, arrives in the United States 
 1969: Shunryu Suzuki gives Zentatsu Richard Baker Dharma transmission; begins transmission with Jakusho Kwong, but dies before completing process

1970s
 1970: Edward Espe Brown publishes the Tassajara Bread Book
 1970: Shunryu Suzuki's book Zen Mind, Beginner's Mind is published by Weatherhill 
 1970: Shunryu Suzuki ordains Tenshin Reb Anderson
 1970: Shasta Abbey is established in Mount Shasta, California by Jiyu Kennett
 1970: James Ishmael Ford received Dharma transmission from Houn Jiyu Kennett 2 May 1971
 1970: Santa Cruz Zen Center is founded by Kobun Chino Roshi.
 1971  Shunryu Suzuki ordains Keido Les Kaye
 1971: Shunryu Suzuki dies.
 1971: Yamada Koun moves to Diamond Sangha in Hawaii to lead sesshin
 1971: Kobun Chino Otogawa becomes abbot of Haiku Zen Center
 1971: Kyozan Joshu Sasaki founds Mount Baldy Zen Center
 1972: Seung Sahn arrives from Korea in Providence, Rhode Island and founds the Providence Zen Center
 1972: Green Gulch Farm opens in Muir Beach, CA as part of the San Francisco Zen Center
 1972 First meeting of the Zen Center of Syracuse founded by graduate students of Syracuse University
 1972: Dainin Katagiri founds the Minnesota Zen Center
 1972: Eido Tai Shimano receives Dharma transmission (Inka Shomei) from Soen Nakagawa at NY Zendo
 1973: Haku'un Yasutani dies 
 1973: Kyozan Joshu Sasaki founds Bodhi Manda Zen Center
 1973: Jakusho Kwong founds the Sonoma Mountain Zen Center
 1973: Seikan Hasegawa founds Rock Creek Buddhist Temple of America, Inc., in Derwood, Maryland
 1973: The Cambridge Zen Center is founded as part of the Kwan Um School of Zen
 1973: The New Haven Zen Center is founded as part of the Kwan Um School of Zen
 1974: Robert Pirsig publishes Zen and the Art of Motorcycle Maintenance: An Inquiry into Values.
 1974: Robert Baker Aitken receives teaching permission from Yamada Koun 
 1974: The Chicago Zen Center is founded by Philip Kapleau
 1975?: Taizan Maezumi founds the White Plum Asanga
 1975: The Chogye International Zen Center is founded by the Kwan Um School of Zen in New York City
 1975: Seikan Hasegawa's book, The Cave of Poison Grass, Essays on the Hannya Sutra is published by Great Ocean Publishers 
 1976: Shohaku Okumura helps found Valley Zendo in Charlemont, MA
 1976: Dai Bosatsu Zendo Kongo-Ji opens in the Catskill Mountains of New York State
 1976: Tetsugen Bernard Glassman becomes Taizan Maezumi's first Dharma successor
 1976: The City of Ten Thousand Buddhas is built, the first and still largest Chinese Ch'an community in the United States
 1976: Heng Sure is ordained by Hsuan Hua, becomes one of the first Western Chinese Ch'an monks
 1977: Kyogen Carlson receives Dharma transmission from Jiyu Kennett
 1977: Seikan Hasegawa's book, Essays on Marriage is published by Great Ocean Publishers
 1977?: The Atlanta Soto Zen Center is founded by Zenkai Michael Elliston
 1978: The Buddhist Peace Fellowship is founded
 1978: Charlotte Joko Beck receives Dharma transmission from Taizan Maezumi
 1978: Genki Takabayashi becomes resident teacher at the Seattle Zen Center
 1979: Maurine Stuart becomes President of the Cambridge Buddhist Association
 1979: Omori Sogen of Tenryu-ji founds Daihonzan Chozen-ji in Honolulu, the first Rinzai Zen temple headquarters established outside Japan.

1980s
 1980: Ch'an master Sheng-yen begins teaching in the United States
 1980: Dennis Genpo Merzel receives shiho (permission to teach) from Taizan Maezumi
 1980: Hartford Street Zen Center is established
 1980: Zen Mountain Monastery in founded in Mount Tremper, New York by Taizan Maezumi and John Daido Loori
 1981: Toni Packer leaves Rochester Zen Center and founds her own non-Buddhist retreat
 1981: Taizan Maezumi founds Yokoji Zen Mountain Center
 1982: Maurine Stuart informally receives the title roshi from Soen Nakagawa in a private ceremony
 1982: The Rinzai temple that would become Daiyuzenji is founded in Chicago, Illinois as a betsuin (branch) of Daihonzan Chozen-ji by Tenshin Tanouye and Fumio Toyoda.
 1983: Jan Chozen Bays receives Dharma transmission from Taizan Maezumi
 1983: The Kwan Um School of Zen is established by Seung Sahn Soen Sa Nim
 1983: Dai Bai Zan Cho Bo Zen Ji is founded in Seattle, Washington by Genki Takabayashi
 1983: Zentatsu Richard Baker confers Dharma transmission to Tenshin Reb Anderson
 1983: Taizan Maezumi is confronted about his sexual relationships with some students and enters alcoholism treatment
 1984: Zentatsu Richard Baker resigns as abbot of San Francisco Zen Center amidst controversy
 1984: Katagiri Roshi, abbot of the Minnesota Zen Meditation Center, agrees to serve as interim abbot of the San Francisco Zen Center
 1984: The Kanzeon Zen Center is founded by Dennis Genpo Merzel in Salt Lake City, Utah
 1984: Soen Nakagawa dies at Ryutaku-Ji
 1984: The New Orleans Zen Temple is founded by Robert Livingston in New Orleans, Louisiana
 1984: Sojun Mel Weitsman receives Dharma transmission from Hoitsu Suzuki, son of Shunryu Suzuki 
 1985   Keido Les Kaye receives Dharma transmission from Hoitsu Suzuki
 1985: Tenshin Reb Anderson succeeds Dainen Katagiri Roshi as abbot of San Francisco Zen Center
 1985: Robert Baker Aitken receives Dharma transmission from Yamada Koun 
1985: Tozen Akiyama founds the Milwaukee Zen Center, in Milwaukee, Wisconsin, and heads it until 2000. 
 1986: Bodhin Kjolhede is installed as abbot of Rochester Zen Center as Philip Kapleau retires
 1986: Sojun Mel Weitsman joins Tenshin Reb Anderson as co-abbot of San Francisco Zen Center
 1986: Furnace Mountain is founded in Clay City, Kentucky by Dae Gak and Seung Sahn as part of the Kwan Um School of Zen
 1986: Toronto Zen Center is incorporated.
 1986: Village Zendo is established in New York City in the apartment of Pat Enkyo O'Hara
 1987: Maitri Hospice begins caring for AIDS patients at the Hartford Street Zen Center (the first Buddhist hospice of its kind in the United States)
 1987: Issho Fujita becomes abbot of Pioneer Valley Zendo in Charlemont, Massachusetts
 1988: Blanche Hartman receives Dharma transmission from Sojun Mel Weitsman
 1988: Yamada Koun gives Dharma transmission to Ruben Habito
 1988: Zoketsu Norman Fischer receives Dharma transmission from Sojun Mel Weitsman
 1988  Keido Les Kaye invited to be abbot of Kannon Do in Mountain View, CA
 1988: Hsi Lai Temple is built, the largest Chinese Chan community in Southern California, a Triple Platform Monastic Ordination is convened
 1988: The Kwan Um School of Zen is rocked by revelations that Seung Sahn had sexual relationships with three students
 1989: Issan Dorsey becomes abbot of Hartford Street Zen Center
 1989?: The American Zen Teachers Association is founded
 1989: Nonin Chowaney receives Dharma transmission from Dainin Katagiri
 1989: Yamada Koun dies
 1989: Danan Henry Roshi receives Dharma transmission from Philip Kapleau Roshi
 1989: Zen Center of Denver founded with Danan Henry Roshi installed as abbot

1990s 
 1990: Issan Dorsey dies of AIDS
 1990: Maurine Stuart dies of cancer 
 1990: Gerry Shishin Wick receives Dharma transmission from Hakuyu Taizan Maezumi
 1990: Joan Halifax receives "Lamp Transmission" from Thich Nhat Hanh
 1990: Dainin Katagiri dies
 1990: The Upaya Zen Center is founded by Joan Halifax in Santa Fe, New Mexico
 1991: The Maria Kannon Zen Center is founded by Ruben Habito in Dallas, Texas
 1991: Zenshin Philip Whalen becomes the new abbot of Hartford Street Zen Center
 1991: The Mount Equity Zendo is founded by Dai-En Bennage in Pennsdale, Pennsylvania
 1992: Mary Farkas of the First Zen Institute of America dies
 1992: Caitriona Reed receives teaching authorization from Thich Nhat Hanh
 1992: George Bowman, Soeng Hyang, and Su Bong receive Dharma transmission from Seung Sahn
 1992: Shi Yan Ming arrives in the United States
 1993: Wu Bong, Wu Kwang, and Dae Gak receive Dharma transmission from Seung Sahn 
 1994: Charles Tenshin Fletcher receives Dharma transmission from Taizan Maezumi 
 1994: Su Bong dies during a retreat in Hong Kong
 1994: Still Mind Zendo founded by Janet Jiryu Abels and Father Robert Kennedy in New York City
 1994: Enkyo Pat O'Hara receives shiho from Tetsugen Bernard Glassman
 1994: Taigen Dan Leighton founds Mountain Source Sangha
 1994: Shi Yan Ming founds the USA Shaolin Temple
 1995: Taizan Maezumi dies May 15
 1995: Charles Tenshin Fletcher appointed abbot of Yokoji Zen Mountain Center
 1995: The Ordinary Mind School is founded by Charlotte Joko Beck
 1995: Hsuan Hua dies June 7, age 77
 1995: Taitaku Pat Phelan receives shiho from Sojun Mel Weitsman
 1995: Anne Seisen Saunders receives shiho from Tetsugen Bernard Glassman
 1995: Zoketsu Norman Fischer becomes abbot of San Francisco Zen Center, and serves until 2000
 1995: Shodo Harada founds One Drop Zendo on Whidbey Island in Washington state.
 1996: Blanche Hartman becomes co-abbot of San Francisco Zen Center
 1996  Les Kaye's book, Zen at Work, published by Three Rivers Press
 1996: The Zen Peacemaker Order is founded by Bernard Glassman and his wife, Sandra Jishu Holmes.
1996: Jisho Warner receives dharma transmission from Tozen Akiyama and founds Stone Creek Zen Center in Sebastopol, California.
 1996: The Sanshin Zen Community is founded by Shohaku Okumura in Bloomington, Indiana
 1996: Jiyu Kennett dies November 6
 1996: Jiko Linda Cutts receives Dharma transmission from Tenshin Reb Anderson
 1996: The Hazy Moon Zen Center is founded by William Nyogen Yeo in Los Angeles, California
 1996: Dae Kwang receives Dharma transmission from Seung Sahn
 1996: Bonnie Myotai Treace receives Dharma transmission from John Daido Loori in the Mountains and Rivers Order
 1996: Bernard Glassman confers Dharma Transmission to Dennis Genpo Merzel
 1996: Dharma Drum Mountain Buddhist Association is established by Sheng-yen
 1997: Dharma Drum Retreat Center is established in Pine Bush, New York by Sheng-yen and followers
 1996: Ji Bong receives Dharma transmission from Seung Sahn
 1997: Catholic priest Father Robert Kennedy receives inka from Bernard Glassman
 1997: Soyu Matsuoka dies
 1997: Geoffrey Shugen Arnold receives shiho from John Daido Loori
 1998:  Sherry Chayat, born in Brooklyn, became the first American woman to receive transmission in the Rinzai school of Buddhism. She received transmission from Eido Tai Shimano.
 1998: Maylie Scott receives Dharma transmission from Sojun Mel Weitsman
 1998: Hozan Alan Senauke receives Dharma transmission from Sojun Mel Weitsman
 1999: Genjo Marinello founds Chobo-ji
 1999: Joan Halifax receives Dharma transmission from Bernard Glassman
 1999: John Tarrant establishes the Pacific Zen Institute
 1999: Seikan Hasegawa's book Mind to Mind is published by Great Ocean Publishers 
 1999: Zen Center of Pittsburgh – Deep Spring Temple is founded by Nonin Chowaney in Pittsburgh, Pennsylvania

2000—2009
 
 2000: Deer Park Monastery is founded in Escondido, California as part of Thich Nhat Hanh's Order of Interbeing
 2000: Taigen Daniel Leighton receives Dharma transmission from Tenshin Reb Anderson.
 2000: Bon Yeon receives Dharma transmission from Seung Sahn
 2000: Sweetwater Zen Center established in National City, California
 2001: Maylie Scott dies May 10, age 66
 2002: Peter Schneider receives Dharma transmission from Sojun Mel Weitsman
 2002: Zenshin Philip Whalen, abbot of Hartford Street Zen Center, dies on June 26
 2002: Great Vow Zen Monastery founded by Jan Chozen Bays and Hogen Bays in Clatskanie, Oregon
 2002: Kobun Chino Otogawa drowns in Switzerland
 2002: Seirin Barbara Kohn becomes head priest and guiding teacher of Austin Zen Center in Austin, Texas
 2002: Tim Burkett becomes Guiding Teacher of the Minnesota Zen Meditation Center
 2003: Jy Din Shakya opens the Hsu Yun Temple in Honolulu before passing away on March 13
 2003: Paul Haller becomes abbot of San Francisco Zen Center
 2003: Brad Warner publishes the book Hardcore Zen
 2003: Daniel Doen Silberberg receives Dharma transmission from Dennis Genpo Merzel
 2004: Philip Kapleau dies on May 6 from complications of Parkinson's disease
 2004: Seung Sahn dies on November 30 in South Korea
 2004: Soeng Hyang succeeds Seung Sahn as Guiding teacher of the Kwan Um School of Zen
 2004: Angie Boissevain receives Dharma transmission from Vanja Palmers, a Dharma heir of Kobun Chino Otogawa
 2004: Enkyo Pat O'Hara receives Dharma transmission from Tetsugen Bernard Glassman
 2004: Golden Wind Zen Order is founded by Ji Bong in Long Beach, California
 2005: Rinzai Daiyuzenji (formerly a branch temple of Daihonzan Chozen-ji in Hawaii) becomes independent
 2005: Harvey Daiho Hilbert receives Dharma transmission from Hogaku Shozen McGuire and founds Order of Clear Mind Zen.
 2006: Gerry Shishin Wick receives Dharma transmission from Bernard Glassman
 2006: Merle Kodo Boyd becomes first African-American woman to receive Dharma transmission in Zen Buddhism, which she received from Wendy Egyoku Nakao.
 2006: The Nashville Mindfulness Center is founded by Tiếp Hiện 
2007: Joko Dave Haselwood receives dharma transmission from Jisho Warner. 
 2007  Kannon Do completes construction and occupies larger center in  Mountain View, CA
 2007: Rochester Zen Center completes country zendo in Batavia New York called Chapin Mill Zen Retreat Center.
 2007: New York Zen Center for Contemplative Care is founded by Robert Chodo Campbell and Koshin Paley Ellison in New York, NY.
 2008: Roko Sherry Chayat is formally recognized as a "Zen master"
 2008: Genjo Marinello receives Dharma transmission from Eido Tai Shimano
 2008: Hsi Lai Temple celebrates 20th anniversary
 2009: Sheng-yen dies on February 3 at age 80 in Taiwan
 2009: Ancient Dragon Zen Gate is founded by Taigen Daniel Leighton in Chicago.
 2009: John Daido Loori dies in New York at age 78 in Mount Tremper

2010–Present

 2010: Robert Aitken dies in Hawaii at age 93.
 2010: Eko Little resigns as abbot of Shasta Abbey due to misconduct and subsequently disrobes
 2010: Eido Shimano resigns from the board of the Zen Studies Society due to misconduct in July; retires as abbot of the Zen Studies Society in December
 2010: The Soto Zen Buddhist Association (SZBA) approves a document honoring the women ancestors in the Zen tradition at its biannual meeting on October 8, 2010. Female ancestors, dating back 2,500 years from India, China, and Japan, may now be included in the curriculum, ritual, and training offered to Western Zen students.
 2010: Karin Kempe, Ken Morgareidge, and Peggy Sheehan receive Dharma transmission and appointment of abbacy from Danan Henry Roshi who steps down as abbot of the Zen Center of Denver.
 2011: Gyobutsuji Zen Monastery [(行仏寺 gyōbutsu-ji)], a Soto Zen monastery in the line of Shōhaku Okumura is dedicated near Kingston, Arkansas.
 2011: Roko Sherry Chayat was installed as the second Abbot of Dai Bosatsu Zendo Kongo-ji on New Year's Day.
 2011: February, Dennis Genpo Merzel steps down as abbot of the Kanzeon Zen Center and resigns as elder of the White Plum Asanga due to sexual misconduct
 2011: Joko Beck dies
2012: Helen Cortes, Lee Ann Nail and Maria Reis-Habito received Dharma Transmission from Ruben Habito of Maria Kannon Zen Center.
 2012: Dana Kojun Hull receives Dharma Transmission from Jan Chozen Bays and Hogen Bays at Great Vow Zen Monastery
 2012: Seikan Hasegawa's book Essays for Buddhist Trainees is published by Great Ocean Publishers
 2013: Korinji [祖的山光林禅寺], a Rinzai Zen monastery in the line of Tekio Sogen Roshi, is dedicated near Madison, Wisconsin.
 2014: Kyozan Joshu Sasaki dies in Los Angeles at age 107.
 2014: Kyogen Carlson dies in Portland at age 65
 2015: Harvey Daiho Hilbert retires as abbot of the Order of Clear Mind Zen and becomes abbot emeritus.
 2015: Kathryn Shukke Shin Hilbert is installed as abbot of the Order of Clear Mind Zen.
 2015: Joshin Brian Byrnes becomes vice-abbot of Upaya Institute and Zen Center.
 2016: Robert Livingston Roshi retires as abbot of New Orleans Zen Temple and becomes abbot emeritus.  Richard Collins Roshi becomes abbot.
 2016: Rafe Martin receives Dharma transmission from Danan Henry Roshi in a ceremony at the Rochester Zen Center.
 2016: Rebecca Li receives Dharma transmission from Simon Child.
 2016: Ron Hogen Green receives Dharma transmission from Geoffrey Shugen Arnold at Zen Mountain Monastery.
 2017: Jody Hojin Kimmel receives Dharma transmission from Geoffrey Shugen Arnold at Zen Mountain Monastery.
 2018: Vanessa Zuisei Goddard receives Dharma transmission from Geoffrey Shugen Arnold at Zen Mountain Monastery.
 2018: Harvey Daiho Hilbert was re-instated as Abbot of the Order of Clear Mind Zen.
 2018: Joshin Brian Byrnes founds and becomes guiding teacher of Bread Loaf Mountain Zen Community

References

.03
Buddhism, Zen
Zen Buddhism
Zen, Timeline
Timelines of Buddhist history
History of Buddhism in the United States